Leonie or Léonie is a Latin-origin feminine given name meaning "lioness", from the masculine personal name Leon (meaning "lion").  Leonie evolved to Léonie in France. It is rare as a surname.

People
People with the name or its variants include:

 Léonie Abo (born 1945), Bambunda author
 Léonie Adams (1899–1988), American poet
 Leonie Archer, British academic and author
 Leonie Bennett (born 1993), Dutch cricketer
 Leonie Brinkema (born 1944), American judge
 Léonie Duquet (1916–1977), French nun
 Leonie Elliott (born 1988), British actress
 Leonie Frieda (born 1956), Swedish-born former model, translator, and writer
 Léonie Gilmour (1872–1933), American educator, editor, and journalist
 Leonie Hanne, German fashion blogger
 Leonie Huddy, Australian-American political scientist
 Leonie Joubert, South African science writer
 Leonie Krail (born 1986), Swiss ice dancer
 Leonie Kramer (1924-2016), Australian academic, educator and professor
 Leonie Maier (born 1992), German footballer
 Myriam Léonie Mani (born 1977), Cameroonian runner
 Léonie Martin (1903-1941), French nun
 Leonie Rysanek (1926–1998), Austrian dramatic soprano
 Leonie Saint (born 1986), German pornographic actress
 Leonie Sandercock (born 1949), Australian academic
 Leonie Short (born 1956), Australian politician
 Leonie Swann (born 1975), nom de plume of a German crime writer

Fictional characters
Leonie Pinelli, a character from Fire Emblem: Three Houses
Aunt Léonie, a character from In Search of Lost Time (À la recherche du temps perdu), novel written by Marcel Proust (1871-1922)

See also 
 Leonie (film), a 2010 film
 Leon (disambiguation)

References 

Given names
Feminine given names